Jim Reilly (1925 - 21 June 2013) was an Irish Gaelic footballer who played as a full-back at senior level for the Meath county team.

References

1925 births
2013 deaths
Gaelic football backs
Meath inter-county Gaelic footballers
St Peter's Dunboyne Gaelic footballers